Thomas Settle may refer to:

Thomas Settle (North Carolina, 15th–16th Congress) (1789–1857), U.S. Representative from North Carolina, 1817–1821
Thomas Settle (judge) (1831–1888), American judge and politician in North Carolina, Minister to Peru
Thomas Settle (North Carolina, 53rd–54th Congress) (1865–1919), U.S. Representative from North Carolina, 1893–1897
Thomas G. W. Settle (1895–1980), U.S. Navy aviator and rear admiral